Kelsey is an unincorporated area in Upshur County, Texas, United States that was the longest-lasting settlement founded by members of the Church of Jesus Christ of Latter-day Saints in the state.  Now a ghost town, it has been called the "mother colony" of Latter-day Saint colonies in Texas.

History
The origins of Kelsey go back to 1898. John Edgar—who had tried to settle in Mesa, Arizona, but had not succeeded—settled near Hopewell in Upshur County. In 1898, Edgar purchased land in what would become Kelsey.

By 1901, there were nine Latter-day Saint families in Kelsey. On August 4, 1901, a Sunday School of the church was organized at Kelsey.  This same year, James G. Duffin, president of the Southwest States Mission of the church, received approval from the First Presidency for the building up of this settlement.  In 1902, Abraham O. Woodruff and Duffin laid out the townsite for Kelsey.

A post office was established at Kelsey in 1902. By 1906, Kelsey had about 400 inhabitants.

In 1907, the Kelsey School District was formed.  In 1911, a two-story brick schoolhouse was built. The first gymnasium in East Texas, named Bennion Hall after mission president Samuel O. Bennion, was completed at Kelsey in 1929.

By 1910 the population had risen to 527.  In 1923, the population peaked at 750.  Families gathered to Kelsey from throughout the southern United States and even on rare occasions from other parts of the United States.

Kelsey was a stop on the Marshall and East Texas Railway. Kelsey was Milepost 24.8 on the M&ET. The railroad built a branch line to Kelsey to facilitate the loading of such products as strawberries, cantaloupes and corn that were grown in the community.

During the 1930s, Kelsey farmers provided food to the oil workers in Kilgore and Gladewater, Texas. In 1943, the school in Kelsey was closed and after that students were bussed to Gilmer, Texas. In 1951, a new church was built in Kelsey.

See also
 The Church of Jesus Christ of Latter-day Saints in Texas
 Enoch, Texas

Notes

References
 T. Lindsay Baker (1986). Ghost Towns of Texas (Norman: University of Oklahoma Press)

External links
 Christopher Long, "Kelsey, Texas", The Handbook of Texas Online
Kelsey Texas collection, MSS 1681 at the L. Tom Perry Special Collections, Harold B. Lee Library, Brigham Young University

Defunct organizational subdivisions of the Church of Jesus Christ of Latter-day Saints
Ghost towns in East Texas
Latter Day Saint movement in Texas
Populated places in Upshur County, Texas